Joseph Cardona (born April 16, 1992) is an American football long snapper for the New England Patriots of the National Football League (NFL). A graduate of the U.S. Naval Academy, Cardona is also an officer in the U.S. Naval Reserve holding the rank of Lieutenant.

Cardona was drafted in the fifth round (166th overall) of the 2015 NFL draft. He played college football for Navy. He is only the fourth player designated as a long snapper ever to be drafted, and the second highest-drafted long snapper in NFL history, after Ryan Pontbriand. With the Patriots, he won Super Bowl LI and Super Bowl LIII.

Early life
Cardona grew up in El Cajon, California, the son of Patrick and Margaret Cardona, and is of Mexican heritage. Joe has two older siblings Arthur and Adrienne Hernandez, and one younger sister Sophia Cardona. He attended Granite Hills High School, lettering two years in football and four years in lacrosse, earning conference lacrosse MVP as a senior. He graduated in 2010.

College career
After high school, Cardona attended the Naval Academy Preparatory School in Newport, Rhode Island, for one year before enrolling in the Naval Academy, where he majored in economics. At Navy, he was a four-year starter in football as a long snapper, where he was not charged with a single bad snap.  During his four years at Navy, the Midshipmen compiled a 30–21 record, including four wins over arch-rival Army, and played in three bowl games.

Professional career
On May 2, 2015, the New England Patriots selected Cardona in the fifth round (166th overall) of the 2015 NFL draft, making him the fourth pure long snapper to be drafted in NFL history (and the second drafted by the Patriots, after Jake Ingram). His Naval assignment was delayed until after the 2015 NFL season so that he would be able to play in the NFL. The Patriots officially signed Cardona to his rookie contract on June 4, 2015. The structure of his contract is unusual, reflecting the uncertainty of his availability in future seasons. The signing bonus of $100,000 is less than the expected bonus of about $190,000 expected for his draft slot, but he can earn $100,000 in roster bonuses if he is on the 53-man roster or an injury list at any point in 2015, 2016, and 2017 seasons.

On Thursday, September 10, in the NFL's opening game of the 2015 season, Cardona made his official debut as a long snapper in the Patriots' 28–21 win over the Pittsburgh Steelers.

On May 13, 2016, United States Secretary of the Navy Ray Mabus approved Cardona's request (and the request of Baltimore Ravens wide receiver Keenan Reynolds) to play in the NFL for the 2016 season.

For the second consecutive season, Cardona played in all 16 games for the Patriots. He was part of both Patriots' playoff wins, and went on to play in Super Bowl LI on February 5, 2017. He was a contributor to the Patriots as they defeated the Atlanta Falcons by a score of 34–28 in overtime. Cardona had an active role in the game on seven special teams plays.

In 2017 Cardona was part of both Patriots' playoff wins, and went on to play in Super Bowl LII on February 4, 2018. The Patriots failed to repeat as Super Bowl Champions after losing 41–33 to the Philadelphia Eagles.

On June 14, 2018, Cardona signed a four-year contract extension with the Patriots. The Patriots reached Super Bowl LIII where they beat the Los Angeles Rams 13-3.

Military career 

During his rookie season, Cardona spent his off days working a 24-hour shift as Command Duty Officer at the Naval Academy Preparatory School.

On June 7, 2019, Cardona was promoted to lieutenant in a ceremony at Gillette Stadium. The ceremony took place the day after the 75th anniversary of D-Day, as well as the day of the Patriots' ring ceremony for their Super Bowl LIII win.

References

1992 births
Living people
American football long snappers
American sportspeople of Mexican descent
Navy Midshipmen football players
New England Patriots players
Players of American football from California
Sportspeople from El Cajon, California
Military personnel from California